McCosker's flasher wrasse, Paracheilinus mccoskeri, is a species of wrasse native to the Indian Ocean, from East Africa to Thailand and northern Sumatra. It can be found in the aquarium trade. The common name and specific name honours the American ichthyologist John E. McCosker who collected the type specimens and colour photographs used in the description of this species by Randall and Harmelin-Vivien.

References

McCosker's flasher wrasse
Fish described in 1977